Radosław Biliński (born 27 September 1972) is a retired Polish football midfielder.

References

1972 births
Living people
Polish footballers
Pogoń Szczecin players
Błękitni Stargard players
Amica Wronki players
U.S.D. Castelsardo players
Association football midfielders
Polish expatriate footballers
Expatriate footballers in Italy
Polish expatriate sportspeople in Italy